The 1934 World Fencing Championships were held in Warsaw, Poland.

Medal summary

Men's events

Women's events

References

World Fencing Championships
Fencing Championships
F
Sports competitions in Warsaw